@ Paradiso is a live EP by Gary Lucas, released on February 23, 1999, through Oxygen Records.

Track listing

Personnel 
Gary Lucas – guitar, production

References 

 

1998 EPs
Gary Lucas albums